The Battle of Mariupol was fought between the 1st Zadneprovsk Ukrainian Soviet Division and the Volunteer Army, during March 1919.

History
On March 19, the first offensive of the Dnieper Division took place, during which Nestor Makhno's troops forced the enemy to flee to the city, after a long firefight. This caused great panic among the troops of the Volunteer Army. On March 21, after reading an order for the brigade to advance in the eastern direction, Makhno explained that he could not take Mariupol at once and had to retreat from it. Troops were subsequently redeployed and the city was occupied by the 8th and 9th regiments. The city's capture was complicated by the presence in the raid of Entente warships. But Mariupol was surrounded on three sides, and in the coming days would be taken.

On March 25, the second offensive began, and on March 27 the city was occupied by the Makhnovist guerrillas. The people greeted them joyfully, and a committee of the underground Bolshevik Communist Party, a military-revolutionary committee, and a commissariat of the Soviet People's Militia were immediately organized in the city. The head of the 1st Zadneprovsk Division, Pavel Dybenko, telegraphed from the liberated Mariupol to the Soviet People's Commissar of the USSR:

Nestor Makhno himself was awarded the Order of the Red Banner.

References

1919 in Ukraine
Mariupol
Mariupol
Mariupol
Makhnovshchina
March 1919 events
History of Mariupol
Russian Revolution in Ukraine